Ritchie Pickett (16 February 1955 – 13 March 2011) was a New Zealand country music singer-songwriter who was born in Morrinsville, in the Waikato region. Pickett has been described as one of New Zealand's "kings of country/rock".

He began playing in rock 'n' roll bands such as Graffiti, which toured New Zealand with singer Tom Sharplin in the mid-1970s, before joining heavy metal/prog rock band Think, with whom he recorded an album.

Think relocated to Sydney, where they broke up and Pickett formed his own band called Snuff. In 1981, Pickett was transported back to Waikato Hospital in New Zealand.

In the early 1980s, he formed country music band Ritchie Pickett & the Inlaws which toured New Zealand relentlessly and released an acclaimed LP, but disbanded in 1985. He was also a regular performer on the high-rating primetime television show That's Country.

Pickett fronted several Waikato bands through the late 1980s and early 1990s, including the Jones Boys, the Fat Band, Stingray Martini's Excellent Duckbeast (featuring Tim Armstrong) and the Disturbance, before working mainly under his own name.

In a newspaper article detailing Bay of Plenty music of the late 1980s it was reported, "Ruling the roost at the time – or at least Tauranga's most well-known performer thanks to a stint on TV and a major label album (LP of course) – was Ritchie Pickett, with his band the Jones Boys, featuring bassist/singer Chris Gunn."

Pickett finally released his debut solo album in 1998. As New Zealand rock historian John Dix wrote of local country music of the time, "It wasn't all alt. rock, hip hop and hard rock in the '90s. Country rock survived with recording acts like the Coalrangers (from the wild West Coast), Glen Moffatt, Ritchie Pickett, The Renderers and the Waltons. The most successful were the Warratahs, signed to Pagan."

In 2004, Pickett released a live album featuring his contributions from a New Zealand tour with fellow New Zealand songwriter Glen Moffatt and Australian roots songwriter Bill Chambers, father of Kasey Chambers. Five years later he was part of the band The Rattler, also featuring former members of Knightshade and the Furys, which released The Leaving.

Pickett died on 13 March 2011 at the age of 56.

Discography

References

External links
AudioCulture profile

1955 births
2011 deaths
New Zealand country singers
New Zealand songwriters
Male songwriters
People from Morrinsville
20th-century New Zealand male  singers
21st-century New Zealand  male singers